Hektor Icefall is an icefall extending in an arc about  long at the head of Sherratt Bay, on the south coast of King George Island in the South Shetland Islands. It was named by the UK Antarctic Place-Names Committee in 1960 for the Hektor Whaling Company which operated the land station at Deception Island from 1912 to 1931, and worked chiefly in the waters of the South Shetland Islands.

References

Icefalls of Antarctica
Landforms of King George Island (South Shetland Islands)
Bodies of ice of the South Shetland Islands